Freetown is an area in East Hampton (town), New York originally inhabited by freed slaves and Native Americans.

East Hampton in the early 19th century was lightly populated and one of the biggest slave holders were descendants of Lion Gardiner who owned Gardiner's Island.  During the War of 1812 slaves from the island were used to ferry supplies back and forth because they could slip through British lines because it was "obvious" that they were "owned."

After slavery was abolished in New York State in 1827, freed slaves were relocated to small houses just north of East Hampton (village), New York.  An 1858 Chace Map shows only 13 structures in town 

In 1879 Arthur W. Benson bought 10,000 acres (40 km2) around Montauk, New York from the Montaukett tribe and relocated tribe members to Freetown.

There is little direct connection to the neighborhood now.  One of the last structures from the town is the St. Matthews Chapel which was moved in 1976 to what is now East Hampton Pointe.

References

East Hampton (town), New York
East Hampton (village), New York
Populated places established in 1827
1827 establishments in New York (state)
Populated places in New York established by African Americans